St. Michael's Church, also called Dongjiaoming Street Church (东交民巷天主堂), is a church that was formerly in the French Legation of Beijing. It was built in 1901.

References

French diaspora in Asia
Roman Catholic churches in Beijing